Anzac, the Landing 1915 is a painting by Australian artist George Washington Lambert, composed between 1920 and 1922. The painting depicts the landing at Anzac Cove by the Australian and New Zealand Army Corps on 25 April 1915 during the Gallipoli Campaign during World War I. The painting is  part of the collections of the Australian War Memorial and "an active agent in promulgating one of Australia’s most dominant and enduring memories – that of the Gallipoli campaign."

Composition

The painting shows "Australian troops ascending ridge to Plugge's Plateau, The Sphinx, Walker's Ridge and Baby 700 on skyline, steep, rocky hillside at Gallipoli".

The painting has a viewing arc of around 240°, greater than the human eye can see in a single glance. It also shows various groups of soldiers landing, climbing and cresting the ridges simultaneously. Lambert felt this distortion of space and time necessary to show the entire story of the landing, balancing the need to interpret the landing in a moment with the requirement to be accurate and maintain the public trust that his painting was a reliable record of events. Lambert also took artistic licence in other matters, notably showing all Australian troops in slouch hats rather than portraying some in caps, which were worn on the day.

Reception
The painting was commissioned in 1919 for £500 by the Australian High Commission in London, as part of an official war art scheme. Lambert started work on London and completed the work in 1922. It was unveiled on ANZAC Day (25 April) 1922 in Melbourne. The work was immediately popular with over 14,000 viewers in the first week of exhibition and over 770,000 by the time the exhibition closed in 1924.

Painter and critic Alexander Colquhoun in a contemporary review stated Lambert's work showed "rare dramatic and artistic skill" and "speaks ... of a declaration of sacrifice and achievement in a way that no other war picture has done".

References

Paintings by George Washington Lambert
1922 paintings
War paintings
Works about the Gallipoli campaign
Collections of the Australian War Memorial